

Parks and Wildlife Commission of the Northern Territory (also known as the Parks and Wildlife Division in some sources) is the Northern Territory Government agency responsible for tasks including the establishment of "parks, reserves, sanctuaries and other land", the management of these and the "protection, conservation and sustainable use of wildlife."

It was created under the Parks and Wildlife Commission Act on 29 November 1995 to replace the former Conservation Commission of the Northern Territory.  On 12 September 2016, the commission was amalgamated by an administrative arrangement order along with the Department of Arts and Museums, Department of Sport and Recreation, Tourism NT, and parts of both the Department of Lands, Planning and Environment and the Department of Land Resource Management to establish the Department of Tourism and Culture.

As of June 2017, it was described as follows:Parks and Wildlife is responsible for protecting and developing the Territory’s parks and reserves for the benefit of the community, and also administers wildlife management programs. The Parks and Wildlife Division manages 87 parks and reserves covering close to 5.05 million hectares and containing spectacular natural, cultural, geological, historical, tourism and recreational values. Some 33 Territory parks are jointly managed with the traditional owners..

As of June 2017, it was structured into the following units:
Northern Australian Parks,
Central Australian Parks,
Savannah/Gulf Parks, 
Tourism and Visitor, 
Engagement, 
Park Development, 
Business Services, 
Wildlife Operations, 
George Brown Darwin Botanic Gardens, 
Alice Springs Desert Park, 
Territory Wildlife Park.

It operates from administrative centres in Darwin, Katherine, Tennant Creek and Alice Springs.

See also
Protected areas of the Northern Territory

References

External links
Official webpage

Government agencies of the Northern Territory
Protected area administrators of Australia